Wacissa is a small unincorporated community and census-designated place (CDP) in Jefferson County, Florida, United States. As of the 2020 census, the population was 362. It shares its name with the Wacissa River, the headwaters of which are about one mile to the south.

Geography
Florida State Road 59 runs through the community, leading north  to U.S. Route 27 and south  to U.S. Route 98.

Demographics

As of the 2010 census, Wacissa had a population of 386 and 197 housing units.

The Wacissa Census Designated Place (CDP) had a population of 418 and 215 housing units as of July 1, 2021.

Cemeteries
Bethpage Cemetery
Broomsage Cemetery
Walker Cemetery
Story Cemetery

Churches
Bethpage Church
Wacissa Pentecostal Holiness Church
United Methodist Church
Welaunee Church
Union Hill AME Church

Education
Jefferson County Schools operates public schools, including Jefferson County Middle / High School.

References

External links 
 Wacissa local community website

Unincorporated communities in Jefferson County, Florida
Tallahassee metropolitan area
Unincorporated communities in Florida
Census-designated places in Florida